The Middle of the World is a 1974 Swiss-French romance film directed by Alain Tanner. The film was selected as the Swiss entry for the Best Foreign Language Film at the 47th Academy Awards, but was not accepted as a nominee. It was screened at the 2011 International Filmfestival Mannheim-Heidelberg.

Plot
The married young Swiss politician Paul gives an election speech in a restaurant and falls in love with an Italian waitress named Adriana who works there. Their love affair becomes quickly public knowledge. Paul's wife abandons him and takes their child with her. His damaged reputation makes him lose the election. He seeks solace by concentrating on his relationship with Adriana, yet she feels she was only a kind of object for him and leaves him too.

Cast
 Olimpia Carlisi as Adriana
 Philippe Léotard as Paul
 Juliet Berto as Juliette
 Denise Péron as Schmidt
 Jacques Denis as Marcel
 Roger Jendly as Roger
 Gilbert Bahon as Albert
 Pierre Walker as the ADP president
 Paul Paquier as Gavault
 Adrien Nicati as Paul's father

See also
 List of submissions to the 47th Academy Awards for Best Foreign Language Film
 List of Swiss submissions for the Academy Award for Best Foreign Language Film

References

External links
 

1974 films
1974 romantic drama films
French romantic drama films
Swiss romantic drama films
1970s French-language films
Films directed by Alain Tanner
Adultery in films
Films about politicians
1970s French films